

Hermann Rasch (26 August 1914 – 10 June 1974) was a German U-boat commander of  in World War II. He was a recipient of the Knight's Cross of the Iron Cross of Nazi Germany.

The sinking of this ship, compounded with U-106s attack on another tanker, the Faja de Oro, made Mexico declare war on the Axis powers.

Awards
 Wehrmacht Long Service Award 4th Class (8 April 1938)
 Spanish Cross in Bronze without Swords (6 June 1939)
 Iron Cross (1939) 1st Class (11 July 1941)
 Knight's Cross of the Iron Cross on 29 December 1942 as Kapitänleutnant and commander of U-106

References

Citations

Bibliography

External links 

1914 births
1974 deaths
U-boat commanders (Kriegsmarine)
German military personnel of the Spanish Civil War
Recipients of the Knight's Cross of the Iron Cross
People from Wilhelmshaven
Reichsmarine personnel
People from the Province of Hanover
Military personnel from Lower Saxony